Wild Cat Hill is a summit in Oregon County in the Ozarks of southern Missouri. It is located about 1.5 miles east of Alton just north of US Route 160.

Wild Cat Hill was so named on account of wildcats in the area.

References

Landforms of Oregon County, Missouri
Hills of Missouri